The Class E31 (E31形) is a class of DC Bo-Bo wheel arrangement electric locomotives formerly operated by the private railway operator Seibu Railway in Japan until March 2010 and subsequently by the Ōigawa Railway.

Four locomotives (numbered E31 to E34) were built at Seibu's Tokorozawa factory between 1986 and 1987 to replace ageing first-generation electric locomotives on freight services and track maintenance train duties. The DT-20A bogies were reused from former JNR 80 series EMUs, and the traction motors were modified from former EMU motors.

They were normally used in pairs by Seibu for top-and-tailing permanent way maintenance trains and to haul newly delivered rolling stock.

Locomotive number E33 was withdrawn on 31 January 2009, becoming the first of the class to be withdrawn. The remaining three locomotives were withdrawn on 28 March 2010.

In September 2010, three of the withdrawn Class E31 locomotives (E32 to E34) were transferred to the Ōigawa Railway to replace the ageing E10 and ED500 locomotives used there. Initially they were used only for depot shunting duties, but from 2017 they underwent overhaul in preparation for use as helper locomotives on steam-hauled trains, with the first locomotive treated, E34, scheduled to enter revenue service on 15 October 2017. Occasionally, they are used to haul the EL Kawane michi-gō express.

Locomotive E31 remains preserved at Seibu's Yokoze Depot.

See also
 Seibu Class E851

References

External links

 Seibu Railway website 

Electric locomotives of Japan
Bo-Bo locomotives
1500 V DC locomotives
Seibu Railway
Railway locomotives introduced in 1986
1067 mm gauge locomotives of Japan